This is a list of Pehlwani wrestlers who played in Olympics, Asian Games and State level Kesari tournaments.

Olympic Freestyle Wrestlers
 Khashaba Dadasaheb Jadhav - 1952 Olympic bronze medalist, 1948 Olympics 6th place
 Mohammad Bashir - 1960 Olympic bronze medalist, 3-time Commonwealth Games gold medalist, 4-time Asian Games medalist

Asian Games Freestyle Wrestlers

Bhim singh bhati - 1966 Commonwealth Gold medalist in 100 kg
 Chandgiram - 1970 Asian Games gold medalist
Bharat Kesari Gama Pehalwan- Asian Games medalist

Other prominent South Asian wrestlers

Krishan Kumar Bhaprodia - Olympic participant, Bharat Kesari 1986, Rustam-e-Hind, 3 Times National Champion, 3 Times Army Service Champion, Jawahar Kesari* Pandit Brahmdev Mishra - Lion of India, who defeated World Champion Dara Singh within few minutes in Kolkata
 Pandit Ram Narayan Mishra - Lion of Uttar Pradesh
 Akram Pahalwan - son of the wrestling legend Imam Baksh Pahalwan
 Aslam Pahlwan - also trained by Mama Moti Singh
 Bholu Brothers - illustrious Pehlwan Brothers (Bholu, Aslam, Goga, Akram and Azam)
 Mehar din pahlwan - Rustam-e-Hind, a great wrestler openly challenged all so called top wrestlers of his time and openly double challenged Chandgi Ram and Dara Singh
 Mangla Rai - Rustam-e-Hind
 Goga Pahalwan - son of the wrestling legend Imam Baksh Pahalwan
 Great Gama
 Jaspal Singh Virk - wrestling Legend in India
 Gulam - accompanied the late Pandit Motilal Nehru to Paris in 1900 and defeated Cour-Derelli of Turkey
 Guru Hanuman - wrestler and coach
 Karim Bux - first wrestler to get into world headlines, when he defeated Tom Canon of England in 1892
 Kikkar Singh - Dev-e-Hind, known for his phenomenal chest and body
 Maruti Mane - Jakarta King 1962-1972
 Premnath Wrestler - Guru Premnath, Arjun Awardee 1972
 Rajkumar Baisla (Wrestler) - (Dhyan chand Awardee & Yash Bharti Award)
 Ramesh Kumar
 Uday Chand - Bronze Medalist World Wrestling championship
 Gama Pehalwan - Bharat Kesari and National Champion

References

Pehlwani wrestlers
Lists of wrestlers